
King Xuan of Zhou, personal name Ji Jing, was the eleventh king of the Chinese Zhou Dynasty. Estimated dates of his reign are 827/25–782 BC. 

He worked to restore royal authority after the Gong He interregnum. He fought the 'Western Barbarians' (probably Xianyun) and another group on the Huai River to the southeast. In his ninth year he called a meeting of all the lords. Later he intervened militarily in succession struggles in the states of Lu, Wey and Qi. Sima Qian says "from this time on, the many lords mostly rebelled against royal commands." According to Zhang Shoujie's annotation Correct Meanings (史記正義) to Sima Qian's Records of the Grand Historian, king Xuan is said to have killed the innocent Du Bo (Duke of Tangdu, 唐杜公) and according to tradition was himself killed by an arrow fired by Du Bo's ghost. His son, King You of Zhou was the last king of the Western Zhou.

The Stone Drums of Qin were long mistakenly ascribed to King Xuan.

Family
Queens:
 Queen Xian of Zhou, of the Lü lineage of the Jiang clan of Qi, known as Queen Jiang; a daughter of Duke Wu of Qi; married in 826 BC; the mother of Crown Prince Gongsheng

Concubines:
 Lady Hou
 Nü Jiu

Sons:
 Crown Prince Gongsheng (d. 771 BC), ruled as King You of Zhou from 781–771 BC
 Prince Yuchen (d. 750 BC), claimed the throne as King Xie of Zhou from 770–750 BC
 Prince Changfu, ruled as the Marquis of Yang

Ancestry

See also
Family tree of ancient Chinese emperors

References

Citations

Bibliography
 .
 .
 

782 BC deaths
Zhou dynasty kings
8th-century BC Chinese monarchs
9th-century BC Chinese monarchs
Year of birth unknown